Anne Frances Audain  (née Garrett, born 1 November 1955) is a New Zealand middle and long-distance runner. She competed in three Olympic Games and four Commonwealth Games, winning the 1982 Commonwealth Games 3000m title and a silver medal in the 10,000m at the 1986 Commonwealth Games.

Career
Born in Auckland, Audain finished ninth aged 17 in the 1973 World Cross Country Championships. She ran in the 1500 m at the 1974 British Commonwealth Games in Christchurch, New Zealand, finishing sixth, and top New Zealander, in the final with a time of 4:21.1.

In the 1976 Summer Olympics in Montreal, Audain competed in both the 800 and 1500 m. Although she failed to get past the heats, she broke the New Zealand record for the 1500 m.

Prior to the start of the 1980s, major track and field athletics meetings had not had any women's events longer than 1500 metres. This started to change early in the new decade, and in March 1982, Audain competed in her first 5000 metres, breaking the world record. In the 1982 Commonwealth Games in Brisbane she won Gold in the 3000 metres in 8m 45.53s, a New Zealand record. The record stood for 25 years until it was finally broken by Kim Smith of Auckland, when she ran 8min 35.31sec on 25 July 2007 in Monaco.

At the 1984 Olympic Games Audain competed in the inaugural women's Olympic marathon. In the 1988 Games, her last, she finished 11th in the inaugural women's 10,000 metres.

In 1993 Audain founded the Idaho Women's Fitness Celebration 5K, now the largest  race for women in the USA.

Honours and awards
Audain was awarded the New Zealand 1990 Commemoration Medal. In the 1995 New Year Honours, she was appointed a Member of the Order of the British Empire, for services to athletics.

In February 2008, Audain was inducted into the Running USA Hall of Champions, and on 3 February 2009 she was inducted into the New Zealand Sports Hall of Fame. She has the unique distinction of being in three Halls of Fame in two nations as in 2014 she was also inducted into the RRCA Distance Running Hall of Fame.

International competitions

References

1955 births
Living people
New Zealand female long-distance runners
New Zealand female middle-distance runners
Olympic athletes of New Zealand
Athletes (track and field) at the 1976 Summer Olympics
Athletes (track and field) at the 1984 Summer Olympics
Athletes (track and field) at the 1988 Summer Olympics
Athletes (track and field) at the 1974 British Commonwealth Games
Athletes (track and field) at the 1982 Commonwealth Games
Athletes (track and field) at the 1986 Commonwealth Games
Athletes (track and field) at the 1990 Commonwealth Games
Athletes from Auckland
Commonwealth Games gold medallists for New Zealand
Commonwealth Games silver medallists for New Zealand
New Zealand Members of the Order of the British Empire
Commonwealth Games medallists in athletics
New Zealand female cross country runners
People educated at McAuley High School
Medallists at the 1982 Commonwealth Games
Medallists at the 1986 Commonwealth Games